The 2001 World Weightlifting Championships – Men's 62 kg (men's featherweight) were held in Antalya, Turkey on 5 November.

Medalists

Records

Results

New records

References
Weightlifting World Championships Seniors Statistics, Page 34 
Results at IWF 

2001 World Weightlifting Championships